Spellbound is a Q*bert clone written by P.W. Norris for the ZX Spectrum and published by Beyond Software.

References

External links

1984 video games
Video games about curses
Single-player video games
Video games developed in the United Kingdom
Video game clones
Video games about witchcraft
ZX Spectrum games
ZX Spectrum-only games